John Nichol (1879 – after 1903) was an English professional footballer who played as a winger.

References

1879 births
People from Morpeth, Northumberland
Footballers from Northumberland
English footballers
Association football wingers
Morpeth Harriers F.C. players
Grimsby Town F.C. players
English Football League players
Year of death missing